Zygomyia is a genus of fungus gnats in the family Mycetophilidae. There are at least 80 described species in Zygomyia.

Species
These 84 species belong to the genus Zygomyia:

 Zygomyia acuta Tonnoir & Edwards, 1927 c g
 Zygomyia adpressa Wu & Wang, 2008 c g
 Zygomyia aguarensis Lane, 1951 c g
 Zygomyia aino Okada, 1939 c g
 Zygomyia albinotata Tonnoir & Edwards, 1927 c g
 Zygomyia angusta Plassmann, 1977 c g
 Zygomyia apicalis Tonnoir & Edwards, 1927 c g
 Zygomyia argentina Lane, 1961 c g
 Zygomyia aurantiaca Edwards, 1934 c g
 Zygomyia bicolor Edwards, 1934 c g
 Zygomyia bifasciata Garrett, 1925 i c g
 Zygomyia bifasciola Matile, 1989 c g
 Zygomyia bivittata Tonnoir & Edwards, 1927 c g
 Zygomyia brasiliana Lane, 1947 c g
 Zygomyia brunnea Tonnoir & Edwards, 1927 c g
 Zygomyia calvusa Wu, 1999 c g
 Zygomyia chavantesi Lane, 1951 c g
 Zygomyia christata Garrett, 1925 i c g
 Zygomyia christulata Garrett, 1925 i c g
 Zygomyia costata Tonnoir & Edwards, 1927 c g
 Zygomyia coxalis Garrett, 1925 i c g
 Zygomyia crassicauda Tonnoir & Edwards, 1927 c g
 Zygomyia crassipyga Tonnoir & Edwards, 1927 c g
 Zygomyia diffusa Tonnoir, 1927 c g
 Zygomyia diplocercusa Wu & Wang, 2008 c g
 Zygomyia distincta Tonnoir & Edwards, 1927 c g
 Zygomyia egmontensis Zaitzev, 2002 c g
 Zygomyia eluta Tonnoir & Edwards, 1927 c g
 Zygomyia filigera Edwards, 1927 c g
 Zygomyia flavicoxa Marshall, 1896 c g
 Zygomyia flaviventris Winnertz, 1863 c g
 Zygomyia freemani Lane, 1951 c g
 Zygomyia golbachi Lane, 1961 c g
 Zygomyia grisescens Tonnoir & Edwards, 1927 c g
 Zygomyia guttata Tonnoir & Edwards, 1927 c g
 Zygomyia heros Lane, 1951 c g
 Zygomyia herteli Lane, 1951 c g
 Zygomyia humeralis (Wiedemann, 1817) c g
 Zygomyia ignobilis Loew, 1869 i c g
 Zygomyia immaculata Tonnoir & Edwards, 1927 c g
 Zygomyia insipinosa Tonnoir & Edwards, 1927 c g
 Zygomyia interrupta Malloch, 1914 i c g
 Zygomyia jakovlevi Zaitzev , 1989 c g
 Zygomyia kiddi Chandler, 1991 c g
 Zygomyia kurilensis Zaitzev , 1989 c g
 Zygomyia longicauda Tonnoir & Edwards, 1927 c g
 Zygomyia marginata Tonnoir & Edwards, 1927 c g
 Zygomyia matilei Caspers, 1980 c g
 Zygomyia modesta Lane, 1948 c g
 Zygomyia multiseta Zaitzev, 2002 c g
 Zygomyia nigrita Tonnoir & Edwards, 1927 c g
 Zygomyia nigriventris Tonnoir & Edwards, 1927 c g
 Zygomyia nigrohalterata Tonnoir & Edwards, 1927 c g
 Zygomyia notata (Stannius, 1831) c g
 Zygomyia obsoleta Tonnoir & Edwards, 1927 c g
 Zygomyia ornata Loew, 1869 i c g
 Zygomyia ornatipennis Lane, 1948 c g
 Zygomyia ovata Zaitzev, 2002 c g
 Zygomyia penicillata Tonnoir & Edwards, 1927 c g
 Zygomyia pictipennis (Staeger, 1840) c g
 Zygomyia pilosa Garrett, 1925 i c g
 Zygomyia planitarsata Becker, 1908 c g
 Zygomyia plaumanni Lane, 1951 c g
 Zygomyia polyspina Bechev, 1994 c g
 Zygomyia pseudohumeralis Caspers, 1980 c g
 Zygomyia ruficollis Tonnoir & Edwards, 1927 c g
 Zygomyia rufithorax Tonnoir & Edwards, 1927 c g
 Zygomyia setosa Barendrecht, 1938 c g
 Zygomyia similis Tonnoir & Edwards, 1927 c g
 Zygomyia simplex Strobl, 1895 c g
 Zygomyia submarginata Harrison, 1955 c g
 Zygomyia tapuiai Lane, 1951 c g
 Zygomyia taranakiensis Zaitzev, 2002 c g
 Zygomyia trifasciata Tonnoir & Edwards, 1927 c g
 Zygomyia trispinosa Zaitzev, 2002 c g
 Zygomyia truncata Tonnoir, 1927 c g
 Zygomyia unica Ostroverkhova, 1979 c g
 Zygomyia unispinosa Tonnoir, 1927 c g
 Zygomyia valepedro Chandler, 1991 c g
 Zygomyia valeriae Chandler, 1991 c g
 Zygomyia valida Winnertz, 1863 c g
 Zygomyia vara (Staeger, 1840) i c g
 Zygomyia varipes Tonnoir & Edwards , 1927 c g
 Zygomyia zaitzevi Chandler, 1991 c g

Data sources: i=ITIS, c=Catalogue of Life, g=GBIF, b=Bugguide.net

References

Further reading

External links

 

Mycetophilidae
Bibionomorpha genera